Legacy (The Very Best of David Bowie) (also known as Legacy) is a greatest hits album by English musician David Bowie, released on 11 November 2016 through Sony Music Entertainment in the US and Warner Music Group in the UK and several territories.

The album's contents are mostly identical to the two-disc edition of Bowie's previous greatest hits album Nothing Has Changed (2014). "Love Is Lost" and "Sue (Or in a Season of Crime)", which were present on Nothing Has Changed, are replaced by three new selections: "Lazarus" and "I Can't Give Everything Away", both from Bowie's final studio album Blackstar (2016), and the radio edit of the Heathen song "Slow Burn" (which also appears on the three-disc version of Nothing Has Changed). Additionally, a new mix of "Life on Mars?" by Ken Scott, the song's original co-producer, replaces the original version from Hunky Dory (1971), and was released as a single and a special music video to promote the compilation.

A one-disc version, with a non-chronological track listing, was also made available in some markets.  A vinyl LP is also available.

Track listing
All songs written by David Bowie, except where noted.

Standard single disc version / Vinyl LP version 
"Modern Love" is found in the US version only. In the UK/Europe version, Mick Jagger & David Bowie's "Dancing in the street" is in its place. The UK/Europe vinyl LP version includes “Oh, You Pretty Things” that is not included on the US vinyl LP version.

Deluxe 2-disc version 
Disc one

Disc two

Charts

Weekly charts

Year-end charts

Certifications

References

2016 greatest hits albums
Compilation albums published posthumously
David Bowie compilation albums
Sony Music compilation albums
Parlophone compilation albums
Columbia Records compilation albums
Legacy Recordings compilation albums